Science Hall is a historic building at Northwestern Oklahoma State University, and is also known as the Fine Arts Building. It was designed by Solomon Layton and completed in 1907. It was listed on the National Register of Historic Places in 1983.

It is the oldest remaining building on the campus and is an "excellent example" of Jacobean Revival architecture.

References

		
National Register of Historic Places in Woods County, Oklahoma
Tudor Revival architecture in the United States
Buildings and structures completed in 1906
Northwestern Oklahoma State University
1906 establishments in Oklahoma Territory